Robert Memler Friedlund (January 6, 1920 – August 24, 1991) was an American football player.  He played college football for Michigan State College (later known as Michigan State University). He also played professional football in the National Football League for the Philadelphia Eagles in 1946. He appeared in two games. In 1947, he was hired as an assistant football coach at Drake University.

References

1920 births
1991 deaths
American football ends
Michigan State Spartans football players
Philadelphia Eagles players
Players of American football from Illinois
People from Galesburg, Illinois
Drake University people